Accept may refer to:

 Acceptance, a person's assent to the reality of a situation etc.
 Accept (band), a German heavy metal band
 Accept (Accept album), their debut album from 1979
 Accept (Chicken Shack album), 1970
 ACCEPT (organization), a Romanian LGBT rights organisation
 , a computer programming function provided by the Berkeley sockets API

See also
Acceptance (disambiguation)
 Acceptability, the property of a thing to be able to be accepted
 
 
 Receive (disambiguation)
 Rejection (disambiguation)